Inna Kuznetsova (born 1968) is the CEO of 1010data, which she joined as a COO in July 2019.  1010data provides a data-harmonization platform and a granular time-series data analytics for large amounts of data, as well as alternative data solutions for Retail, CPG and Financial industry.  It is considered the partner of choice by Dollar General, Sam’s Club, Procter & Gamble, Bank of America and JP Morgan and other top retail, CPG and financial companies.
Inna Kuznetsova also serves as Independent Non-Executive Director of Global Ports Investments pic (LSE:GLPR). In the past she was the President & COO of INTTRA until its successful acquisition by E2open at the end of 2018; Chief Commercial Officer of CEVA Logistics; and before that, IBM vice president of sales and marketing, Systems Software. She previously served on board of directors of Sage Group.

She graduated from the faculty MSU CMC (1990).

She received an MBA from a business school at Columbia University. She started working in the Russian branch of IBM (since 1993). Head of one of the sales sectors (since 1996). She worked in the IBM office in the United States (since 1997). She was engaged in developing markets and an internal startup IBM Life Sciences. She led the IBM business in Linux (since 2007). Vice President of Marketing and Sales of System Software (2009) – the first Russian vice president at IBM headquarters.

In 2011, in Moscow, the publishing house «Mann, Ivanov and Ferber» published Inna's book «Up! A practical approach to career growth».

In 2013, in Moscow, the publishing house Mann, Ivanov and Ferber published Inna's book A month in the sky. Practical notes on the ways of professional growth.

References

Literature

External links
 
 
 
 
 

American women in business
IBM people
Living people
1968 births
Moscow State University alumni
21st-century American women